Ahmed El Maanouni (born in 1944) is a Moroccan screenwriter, film director, cinematographer, actor and producer. His films include Alyam Alyam (1978), the first Moroccan film to be selected in Cannes Film Festival and winner of the Grand Prize at the Mannheim Film Festival. He caught international attention when his film Trances was honored and presented by Martin Scorsese at the 2007 Cannes Film Festival to inaugurate the World Cinema Foundation. His film Les Coeurs brûlés (2007) won the Grand Prize at the National Film Festival and was awarded many international prizes. His documentary films consistently interrogate colonial history and its impact on Moroccan memory. He directs study groups and educational programs in Morocco and throughout the world. In 2007, he was honored with the title of Officier of the Ordre des Arts et des Lettres in France.

Filmography

Film

Actor
L'Année sainte (1976), directed by Jean Girault
Les Anges de Satan (2007), directed by Ahmed Boulane
Le Retour du Fils (2012), directed by Ahmed Boulane

Awards

1978 : Alyam, Alyam : official selection 1978  Cannes Film Festival
Grand prize 1978 Mannheim-Heidelberg International Film Festival
Winner 1st Film Award at Carthage Film Festival
Winner 7th Art Award at Fespaco
CICAE prize at Taormina Film Fest
Jury Prize at Festival international du film francophone de Namur
Critics Prize at Damascus International Film Festival
1981 : Trances : 1st ESEC Prize 1981 Cannes Film Festival,
Audience Award at  National Film Festival Rabat 1982,
First film to be restored by the World Cinema Foundation and presented by Martin Scorsese at Cannes Classics 2007
2007 : Burned Hearts : Grand Prize 2007 National Film Festival Tangiers,
Critics Award 2007 National Film Festival Tangiers,
Best Sound Award 2007 National Film Festival Tangiers,
Best Cinematography Award 2007 at Dubai International Film Festival,
Best Director Award 2008 Oran Film Festival,
Bronze Award 2008 Damascus International Film Festival,
Special Jury Prize and Audience Award 2008 at Tetouan Mediterranean Cinema Festival.

References

External links

Living people
1944 births
20th-century Moroccan male actors
21st-century Moroccan male actors
Moroccan documentary filmmakers
Moroccan film directors
Moroccan male film actors
People from Casablanca